Ancita anisocera is a species of beetle in the family Cerambycidae. It was described by Francis Polkinghorne Pascoe in 1875. It is known from Australia.

References

Ancita
Beetles described in 1875